Warsaw Municipal Airport may refer to:

Warsaw Municipal Airport (Indiana) in Warsaw, Indiana, United States (FAA: ASW)
Warsaw Municipal Airport (Missouri) in Warsaw, Missouri, United States (FAA: RAW)